Stanetinci is a settlement in the Municipality of Sveti Jurij ob Ščavnici in northeastern Slovenia. It lies in the Slovene Hills above the Ščavnica Valley. The area is part of the traditional region of Styria and is now included in the Mura Statistical Region.

References

External links
Stanetinci at Geopedia

Populated places in the Municipality of Sveti Jurij ob Ščavnici